In mathematics, and more specifically in projective geometry, a projective frame or projective basis is a tuple of points in a projective space that can be used for defining homogeneous coordinates in this space. More precisely, in a projective space of dimension , a projective frame is a -tuple of points such that no hyperplane contains  of them. A projective frame is sometimes called a simplex, although a simplex in a space of dimension  has at most  vertices.

In this article, only projective spaces over a field  are considered, although most results can be generalized to projective spaces over a division ring. 

Let  be a projective space of dimension , where  is a -vector space of dimension .

The definition implies the existence of nonzero elements of  such that .

In particular, the only homography fixing the points of a frame is the identity map. This result is much more difficult in synthetic geometry (where projective spaces are defined through axioms). It is sometimes called the first fundamental theorem of projective geometry.

The projective coordinates or homogeneous coordinates of a point   over this frame are the coordinates of the vector  on the basis  If one changes the vectors representing the point  and the frame elements, the coordinates are multiplied by a fixed nonzero scalar.

Commonly, the projective space  is considered.

In the case of a projective line, a frame consists of three distinct points.

References

 
 , translated from the 1977 French original by M. Cole and S. Levy, fourth printing of the 1987 English translation

Projective geometry